Kanchan Chandra Bade (21 April 1967) is a Nepali politician and Leader of Nepali Congress. He is currently a member of Provincial Assembly of Bagmati Province representing Nepali Congress. Bade entered politics as a student, joining the fight against the Panchayat regime as a member of Nepal Students Union, the student wing of Nepali Congress. He was elected to the 2nd Nepalese Constituent Assembly in 2013 from Kavre–3.

He was the State Minister of Industry, Commerce and Supplies from 2016 to 2017 in the coalition government of Communist Party of Nepal (Maoist Centre) and Nepali Congress under the leadership of Pushpa Kamal Dahal.

References

Nepali Congress politicians from Bagmati Province
Living people
Members of the 2nd Nepalese Constituent Assembly
1967 births